Microcosmos is a 1996 documentary film written and directed by Claude Nuridsany and Marie Pérennou and produced by Jacques Perrin. An international co-production of France, Switzerland, Italy and the United Kingdom, the film showcases detailed interactions between insects and other small invertebrates, and features music by Bruno Coulais.

The film was screened out of competition at the 1996 Cannes Film Festival.

Synopsis

Microcosmos, unlike a number of other nature documentaries, does not feature narration for most of its runtime, incorporating only two brief passages of narration. In the French-language version of the film, these passages are narrated by producer Jacques Perrin, while in the English version, Kristin Scott Thomas serves as narrator.

Reception

Critical response

Roger Ebert gave Microcosmos four out of four stars, calling it "...an amazing film that allows us to peer deeply into the insect world and marvel at creatures we casually condemn to squishing." Janet Maslin of The New York Times wrote that "this quick, captivating film offers a taste of the exotic to viewers of any stripe (or spot). And it's a breathtaking reminder that Mother Nature remains the greatest special effects wizard of all."

On review aggregator website Rotten Tomatoes, the film holds an approval rating of 97% based on 33 critics, with an average rating of 8.4/10.

Box office

The film has grossed $52.8 million against a budget of $3.8 million.

Awards and nominations
César Awards (France)
Won: Best Cinematography (Thierry Machado, Claude Nuridsany, Marie Pérennou and Hugues Ryffel)
Won: Best Editing (Florence Ricard and Marie-Josèphe Yoyotte)
Won: Best Music (Bruno Coulais)
Won: Best Producer (Jacques Perrin)
Won: Best Sound (Philippe Barbeau and Bernard Leroux)
Nominated: Best Film
Nominated: Best First Work (Claude Nuridsany and Marie Pérennou)
Nominated: Best Sound (Laurent Quaglio)

See also
List of films with longest production time

References

External links

1996 films
Documentary films about nature
French documentary films
Documentary films about insects
Films about frogs
Films without speech
Films set in France
1990s children's fantasy films
Metro-Goldwyn-Mayer films
1996 documentary films
Georges Delerue Award winners
Films produced by Jacques Perrin
Films scored by Bruno Coulais
Films about arthropods
1990s French films